Government Model high School, Sector-25 (often called GMHS-25 or simply 25model) is a State-funded co-educational secondary school located in Chandigarh, India, educating students in grades K–12. Founded in 1954  it is the oldest school in Chandigarh and among the most selective. The school is affiliated to the Central Board of Secondary Education and offers twenty-three subjects at the AISSCE level, among the highest for any school in the region. It also claims a 100% pass percentage at the All India School Certificate Examination level.

The school's main building was designed by Swiss architect Pierre Jeanneret in line with the former's modernist ideals and was inaugurated by the then Commissioner of the Union Territory of Chandigarh.

References

High schools and secondary schools in Chandigarh